The Simte are one of the tribe of the Kuki community in Northeast India.  They are mainly concentrated in the southern parts of the state of Manipur. Most of the Simte are descendants of Ngaihte. Sim means South in their dialect. Simte people mainly settled in Thanlon Sub-Division, Lamka town in Churachandpur, Manipur, Motbung, Leimakhong and parts of Nagaland areas.  A significant number also are settled in neighbouring areas of Mizoram and Assam. There are also Simte in Chin State in Myanmar.

See also
 List of Scheduled Tribes in India

References

External links
The Simte website

Social groups of India
Kuki tribes
Scheduled Tribes of Manipur